Aleksandr Vladimirovich Zinovyev (born 20 February 1979 in Tobolsk) is a former Russian football player.

References

1979 births
People from Tobolsk
Living people
FC Sibir Novosibirsk players
Russian footballers
FC Shinnik Yaroslavl players
Russian Premier League players
FC Oryol players
FC Ural Yekaterinburg players
Association football midfielders
Sportspeople from Tyumen Oblast